Kenneth Griffith (born Kenneth Reginald Griffiths, 12 October 1921 – 25 June 2006) was a Welsh actor and documentary filmmaker. His outspoken views made him a controversial figure, especially when presenting documentaries which have been called "among the most brilliant, and controversial, ever made in Britain".

Early life
He was born Kenneth Griffiths in Tenby, Pembrokeshire, Wales. His parents separated and left Tenby six months after his birth, leaving him with his paternal grandparents, Emily and Ernest, who adopted him. His grandparents were staunch Wesleyan Methodists who taught him to question everything; he attended the local Wesleyan Methodist chapel three times every Sunday, and became a lively rugby union scrum-half.

He passed the 11-plus and attended Greenhill Grammar School in Tenby, where he met English literature teacher Evelyn Ward, who recognised his writing and acting talent. Before Kenneth left school, his headmaster J. T. Griffith suggested that he drop the "s" from his surname so it would sound less English.

Career
Griffith left school and moved to Cambridge in 1937, taking a job at an ironmonger's weighing nails. This lasted only a day, and proved to be the only job he ever had outside the acting world. Also in 1937, he made his first professional acting appearance when he was cast by Peter Hoare as Cinna the Poet in a modern-dress version of Julius Caesar at the Cambridge Festival Theatre.

He became a regular jobbing repertory actor, making his West End theatre debut in 1938 with a small part in Thomas Dekker's The Shoemaker's Holiday.

Griffith was conscripted into the Royal Air Force during World War II. Before training in Canada, he returned to see his grandparents in Tenby, who, at his request, gave him an English translation of Hitler's book, Mein Kampf so he could better understand the origins of the war. He caught scarlet fever while on his training and was invalided out of the service in 1942, which resulted in his taking up stamp collecting. The first stamp he collected was the Siege of Ladysmith, South Africa.

In 1941, he made his debut in the first of more than 80 films, being Love on the Dole. He joined the Liverpool, Lancashire-relocated Old Vic, and in repertory.

He appeared in many British films between the 1940s and 1980s, notably as Archie Fellows in The Shop at Sly Corner, Jenkins in Only Two Can Play (1962), the wireless operator Jack Phillips on board the Titanic in A Night to Remember (1958), in the crime caper Track the Man Down (1955) and especially in the comedies of the Boulting brothers, including Private's Progress (1956) and I'm All Right Jack (1959).   Other notable film roles included the murderous paedophile Seely in Revenge (1971), the gay medic Witty in The Wild Geese (1978) and a whimsical mechanic in The Sea Wolves (1980).

He appeared in the episodes "The Girl Who Was Death" and "Fall Out" of the 1967–68 TV series The Prisoner. Subsequent TV appearances included episodes of Minder and Lovejoy, and critically acclaimed performances in War and Peace (1963), The Perils of Pendragon, Clochemerle and The Bus to Bosworth, where his personification of a Welsh schoolteacher out on a field trip won him many accolades back in his homeland of Wales.

His later film roles included the "mad old man" in Four Weddings and a Funeral (1994), Reverend Jones in The Englishman Who Went Up a Hill But Came Down a Mountain (1995) and the minister in Very Annie Mary (2001).

Documentaries and political activity
In 1965, Huw Wheldon and the director of BBC2, David Attenborough, asked Griffith if he would like to make a film for the BBC on any subject that he chose. This resulted in a series of BBC films on subjects as diverse as the Boer War in Soldiers of the Widow (1967), A Touch of Churchill, A Touch of Hitler (1971), the controversial story of Thomas Paine in The Most Valuable Englishman Ever, David Ben-Gurion (The Light), Napoleon Bonaparte (The Man on the Rock), Jawaharlal Nehru, Roger Casement (Heart of Darkness, 1992) and on one occasion a film commissioned by Thames Television on the story of the Three Wise Men of the New Testament, A Famous Journey (1979). Griffith was expelled from Iran by the country's Foreign Minister, while making the documentary.

In 1973, Griffith made a documentary film about the life and death of Irish military and political leader Michael Collins titled Hang Up Your Brightest Colours (a line taken from a letter from George Bernard Shaw to one of Collins' sisters after Collins' assassination) for ATV, but the Independent Broadcasting Authority did not permit it to be screened (it was not shown until the BBC broadcast it in 1993).

In 1974, for a programme titled Curious Journey, he interviewed nine surviving IRA members from the 1916–23 period, i.e. the Easter Rebellion, Anglo-Irish War and Irish Civil War; they were Maire Comerford, Joseph Sweeney, Sean Kavanagh, John O'Sullivan, Brigid Thornton, Sean Harling, Martin Walton, David Nelligan (or Neligan) and Tom Barry. He was allowed to buy this last film back, as long as he did not mention who had commissioned it (the Welsh TV company HTV). At one point in his career, Griffith accused the anti-censorship group, Index, of censoring him by delaying the publication of two book reviews he had written for its magazine.

His sympathetic portrayal caused some concern, given The Troubles and ATV boss Sir Lew Grade decided to withdraw the film, which was not shown publicly until 1994. In response Griffith made a documentary, The Public's Right to Know, for Thames TV. The political troubles left him "a frustrated and bemused figure". Screenonline described Griffith as "a world class documentary film-maker" who knew that "refusing to compromise his views has damaged his career".

His autobiography, The Fool's Pardon, was published in 1994 by Little, Brown. BBC Wales presented a retrospective season of five of his documentaries in 1993, including the suppressed Michael Collins work, opening the season with a biographical study of Griffith called The Tenby Poisoner in which Peter O'Toole, Martin McGuinness and Jeremy Isaacs paid tribute. BBC Wales screened a film on Griffith's life in the "Welsh Greats" Series Two, shown in 2008. In 1994, Griffith was given a Cymru lifetime achievement award by BAFTA.

A Boer War historian, Griffith was sympathetic to the Afrikaners in South Africa. His opinion, in a South African television-funded documentary, released in 1984, was "provokingly sympathetic" towards the Afrikaners; South African television eventually withdrew its funding. He made a BBC2 documentary on runner Zola Budd, which purported to reveal injustices done to her by left-wing demonstrators and organisations during a tour of England in 1988.

He named his home (110 Englefield Road, Islington, London) as Michael Collins' House. In later life, Griffith said: "In my time I've been accused of being a Marxist, a fascist, a traitor and, probably worst in most people's eyes, inconsistent. I was a radical Socialist. I'm now a radical Tory. It has been a very painful journey".

Personal life
Griffith was married and divorced three times, and had five children:
 Joan Stock (two sons)
 Doria Noar (one daughter, actress/theatre historian Eva Griffith) 
 Carole Hagar (one daughter, one son)

Death and burial
Griffith died in London on 25 June 2006, aged 84. His coffin was decorated with the flags of Wales, Israel and the Irish tricolour. Griffith was interred beside his grandparents, Emily and Ernest in the churchyard adjoining St Nicholas and St Teilo Church in Penally.

Legacy
Tenby Museum and Art Gallery in Pembrokeshire houses an archive of Griffith's papers and documentaries, and a cabinet containing a collection of personal memorabilia.

Filmography

 Channel Incident (1940) as Johnnie
 The Farmer's Wife (1941) as George Smerdon
 Love on the Dole (1941) as Harry's Pal in Billiard Hall (uncredited)
 The Black Sheep of Whitehall (1942) as Butcher's Boy (uncredited)
 Hard Steel (1942) as Dixon
 The Forest Rangers (1942) as Ranger
 The Great Mr. Handel (1942) as Minor role (uncredited)
 Young and Willing (1943) as Older Actor (uncredited)
 The Shop at Sly Corner (1947) as Archie Fellows
 Fame Is the Spur (1947) as Wartime Miners' Representative (uncredited)
 Bond Street (1948) as Len Phillips
 Forbidden (1949) as Johnny
 Helter Skelter (1949) as Nick Martin's BBC Colleague (uncredited)
 Blue Scar (1949) as Thomas Williams
 Waterfront (1950) as Maurice Bruno
 High Treason (1951) as Jimmy Ellis
 36 Hours (1953) as Henry Slosson
 The Green Carnation (1954) as Nobby
 The Prisoner (1955) as the Secretary
 Track the Man Down (1955) as Ken Orwell
 Private's Progress (1956) as Private Dai Jones
 1984 (1956) as Prisoner
 The Baby and the Battleship (1956) as Sub-Lieutenant
 Tiger in the Smoke (1956) as Crutches
 Brothers in Law (1957) as Hearse Driver
 Lucky Jim (1957) as Cyril Johns
 The Naked Truth (1957) as Porter
 Blue Murder at St Trinian's (1957) as Charlie Bull
 A Night to Remember (1958) as Wireless Operator John 'Jack' Phillips
 Chain of Events (1958) as Clarke
 The Man Upstairs (1958) as Mr. Pollen
 The Two-Headed Spy (1958) as Adolf Hitler
 Tiger Bay (1959) as Choirmaster
 Carlton-Browne of the F.O. (1959) as Sir John's Assistant, Griffths (uncredited)
 I'm All Right Jack (1959) as Dai
 Libel (1959) as Fitch
 Expresso Bongo (1959) as Charlie (uncredited)
 Circus of Horrors (1960) as Martin
 A French Mistress (1960) as Mr. Meade
 Suspect (1960) as Dr. Shole
 Snowball (1960) as Phil Hart
 Payroll (1961) as Monty
 Rag Doll (1961) as Wilson
 The Frightened City (1961) as Wally Smith
 Only Two Can Play (1962) as Ieuan Jenkins
 The Painted Smile (1962) as Kleinie
 We Joined the Navy (1962) as Orator
 Heavens Above! (1963) as Rev. Owen Thomas
 Rotten to the Core (1965) as Lenny the Dip
 The Whisperers (1967) as Mr. Weaver
 The Bobo (1967) as Pepe Gamazo
 The Prisoner (1968) as The President / Schnipps / Number Two
 Decline and Fall... of a Birdwatcher (1968) as Mr. Church
 The Lion in Winter (1968) as Strolling Player
 Great Catherine (1968) as Naryshkin
 The Assassination Bureau (1969) as Monsieur Popescu
 The Gamblers (1970) as Broadfoot
 Revenge (1971) as Seely
 Clochemerle (TV Series) (1972) as Ernest Tafardel
 The House in Nightmare Park (1973) as Ernest Henderson
 Callan (1974) as Waterman
 S*P*Y*S (1974) as Lippet
 Sky Riders (1976) as Wasserman
 Why Shoot the Teacher (1977) as Inspector Woods
 The Wild Geese (1978) as Arthur Witty
 The Sea Wolves (1980) as Wilton
 Who Dares Wins (1982) as Bishop Crick
 Remembrance (1982) as Joe
 The Zany Adventures of Robin Hood (1984) as Isaac of York
 Emily Hobhouse: The Englishwoman (1985) as Presenter
 Shaka Zulu (TV series) (1986) as Zacharias Abrahams
 Four Weddings and a Funeral (1994) as Mad Old Man - Wedding One and Four
 The Englishman Who Went Up a Hill But Came Down a Mountain (1995) as Reverend Jones
 Very Annie Mary (2001) as Minister

References

Sources

External links
 

People from Tenby
Royal Air Force personnel of World War II
Welsh activists
Welsh male film actors
Welsh male stage actors
Welsh male television actors
Welsh television presenters
Welsh Methodists
Deaths from Alzheimer's disease
Deaths from dementia in England
1921 births
2006 deaths
British philatelists